The 2010 mayoral election in Louisville Metro took place on November 2, 2010 alongside other federal, state and local elections.

Incumbent Mayor Jerry Abramson was re-elected with 67% of the vote in 2006, after being elected to his first term with 74% of the vote in 2002. He announced his intention not to run for a third consecutive term, and instead run for Lieutenant Governor of Kentucky in 2011, with Governor Steve Beshear as his running mate.

Primaries for each respective party were held on May 18, 2010, with Greg Fischer receiving the Democratic nomination and Hal Heiner receiving the Republican nomination. On November 2, Greg Fischer was elected Mayor of Louisville in a tight race.

Mayor Abramson stepping down

After three consecutive terms as mayor of the city of Louisville from 1985 to 1999, followed by two consecutive terms as the mayor of Louisville Metro from 2003 to 2011, Mayor Jerry Abramson stepped down to run for Lieutenant Governor of Kentucky in 2011.

Democratic primary

Candidates
Filed
Tyler Allen, businessman and co-founder of 8664.org
Burrel Charles Farnsley, son of former Mayor Charles R. Farnsley
Greg Fischer, businessman and 2008 primary candidate for the U.S. Senate in Kentucky
Jim King, banker, and member and former President of the Louisville Metro Council (2008–2009)
Connie Marshall, community activist
Lisa Moxley, former Communications Director for Barack Obama's 2008 Presidential campaign in Kentucky
David Tandy, attorney and former Louisville Metro Council President (2009–2010)
Shannon White, founder of the Kentucky chapter of Dress for Success, and finance director for 3rd District Congressman John Yarmuth

Polling

Primary results

Republican primary

Candidates
Filed
Hal Heiner, businessman and member of the Louisville Metro Council
Jonathan Robertson, small business owner
Chris Thieneman, businessman and 2008 primary candidate for the U.S. House of Representatives in Kentucky's 3rd District

Polling

Primary results

Independent candidates
Nimbus Couzin, businessman
Jerry Mills

General election

Polling

Results

References

External links
Tyler Allen for Mayor
Greg Fischer for Mayor
Jackie Green for Mayor
Hal Heiner - Louisville Mayor
Jim King - Democrat for Mayor
Connie Marshall - Democrat for Mayor
Jonathan Robertson for Metro Mayor
Elect David Tandy - Mayor Louisville KY - 2010
Chris Thieneman for Mayor!
Shannon White for Louisville
Beshear/Abramson 2011

2010 Kentucky elections
2010
Louisville
Government of Louisville, Kentucky